The Arcade is a covered shopping arcade in downtown Nashville, Tennessee, U.S.. It was built in 1902.

History
The arcade was developed by Daniel Franklin Carter Buntin and constructed by the Edgefield and Nashville Manufacturing Company. It was Nashville's first shopping center, replacing the former Overton Alley. Located between Fourth and Fifth avenues,

The Arcade is at the center of the downtown Nashville Arts District and houses a very vibrant arts community. The Downtown Nashville First Saturday Art Crawl is a monthly event that takes place the first Saturday of every month from 6pm to 9pm. and draws large crowds. All galleries participate in this fun event. There are seventeen galleries in the building including: 
40AU – 69 Arcade; 
From Nashville With Love & M.Florita Jewelry – 5 Arcade; 
Andy Anh Ha Gallery – 83 Arcade; 
BelArt Studio & Gallery – 56 Arcade; 
Blend Studio – 79 Arcade; 
The COOP – 75 Arcade; 
Craig Brabson Fine Art Photography – 64A Arcade; 
Wolf and Crow Gallery – 44 Arcade; 
Hannah Lane Gallery – 64 Arcade; 
L Gallery – 73 Arcade; 
Nostos Gallery – 58-60 Arcade; 
O Gallery – 42 Arcade; 
OPEN – 57 Arcade; 
Space – 61 Arcade; 
Studio 66 – 66 Arcade; 
UltraViolet Gallery & Photography – 59 Arcade; 
WAG – 77 Arcade

Other notable tenants include The Peach Cobbler Factory,  The Peanut Shop candy store and the Uptown Branch of the United States Postal Service, featuring an Art Deco facade.

Architectural design
The arcade was designed by Thompson, Gibel, and Asmus. It was modeled after an arcade in Italy. The entrances consist of identical Palladian facades. It has been listed on the National Register of Historic Places since May 22, 1973.

References

Buildings and structures in Nashville, Tennessee
Shopping malls established in 1902
Commercial buildings on the National Register of Historic Places in Tennessee
Shopping malls in Tennessee
Art Deco architecture in Tennessee
Shopping arcades in the United States
Tourist attractions in Nashville, Tennessee
National Register of Historic Places in Nashville, Tennessee
1902 establishments in Tennessee